Kristen Noel Woods (born December 9, 1987) is a Nashville-based indie-pop singer/songwriter best known for her single "Cave In", which was featured on MTV's 2011 season of The Real World: Las Vegas and peaked at No. 10 on the iTunes singer/songwriter charts, also gaining more than 30,000 views on YouTube.

Biography
Woods was raised in Franklin, Tennessee, graduating from Centennial High School (2006) before attending Auburn University, from which she earned her Bachelor of Fine Arts in Musical Theatre in 2010.

Career
Woods began working with award winning producer and engineer John Jaszcz and production team Zodlounge Music to release her first five-song EP under Jaszcz's Yosh Bros Entertainment independent record label in March 2011. This EP featured "Cave In," that attained a strong following on YouTube and reached No. 10 on the iTunes singer/songwriter chart following a featured spot on MTV's The Real World: Las Vegas in April and May 2011.

The new music blog, Kings of A&R, featured Woods on February 15, 2011 in promotion of her upcoming EP. It was also featured on April 14, 2011 in anticipation of her MTV placement.

A second five-song EP is slated for release in Fall 2011.

On April 9, 2013, after a successful campaign to raise funds on Kickstarter, Woods released a full-length, 11-song album titled "Talking Underwater" with Zodlounge Records. Kree previewed the songs at SXSWM in March 2013 and will embark on a US tour in May 2013 to support the album.

Discography

References

External links
 Official website

1987 births
21st-century American singers
21st-century American women singers
American women singer-songwriters
Living people
People from Franklin, Tennessee
Singer-songwriters from Tennessee